Lüderitz is a town in the ǁKaras Region of southern Namibia. It lies on one of the least hospitable coasts in Africa. It is a port developed around Robert Harbour and Shark Island.

The town is known for its colonial architecture, including some Art Nouveau work, and for wildlife including seals, penguins, flamingos and ostriches. It is also home to a museum, and lies at the end of a  decommissioned railway line to Keetmanshoop. The town is named after Adolf Lüderitz, founder of the German South West Africa colony.

Economy and infrastructure 
The centre of Lüderitz' economic activity is the port, until the incorporation of the exclave Walvis Bay in 1994 the only suitable harbour on Namibia's coast. However, the harbour at Lüderitz has a comparatively shallow rock bottom, making it unusable for many modern ships. The recent addition of a new quay has allowed larger fishing vessels to dock at Lüderitz. The town has also re-styled itself in an attempt to lure tourists to the area, which includes a new waterfront area for shops and offices.

Lüderitz is situated on the B4 national road to Keetmanshoop. It is also the terminus of the  railway line to Seeheim where the railway connects to the rest of the country's network. This line, built by inmates of the concentration camp on Shark Island, was completed in 1908 but is currently not operational. Rebuilding of a remaining  track gap to Aus has been delayed since 2009.

History 

The bay on which Lüderitz is situated was first known to Europeans when Bartolomeu Dias encountered it in 1487. He named the bay Angra Pequena and erected a padrão (stone cross) on the southern peninsula. In the 18th century Dutch adventurers and scientists explored the area in search of minerals but did not have much success. Further exploration expeditions followed in the early 19th century during which the vast wildlife in the ocean was discovered. Profitable enterprises were set up, including whaling, seal hunting, fishing and guano-harvesting. Lüderitz thus began its life as a trading post.

The town was founded in 1883 when Heinrich Vogelsang purchased Angra Pequena and some of the surrounding land on behalf of Adolf Lüderitz, a Hanseat from Bremen in Germany, from the local Nama chief Josef Frederiks II in Bethanie. On 7 August 1884 the German Flag was officially hoisted in Angra Pequena. When Adolf Lüderitz did not return from an expedition to the Orange River in 1886, Angra Pequena was named Lüderitzbucht in his honour.
In 1905, German authorities established a concentration camp on Shark Island. The camp, access to which was very restricted, operated between 1905 and 1907 during the Herero Wars. Between 1,000 and 3,000 Africans from the Herero and Nama tribes died here as a result of the tragic conditions of forced labour. Their labour was used for expansion of the city, railway, port and on the farms of white settlers.

In 1909, after the discovery of diamonds nearby, Lüderitz enjoyed a sudden surge of prosperity due to the development of a diamond rush to the area. In 1912 Lüderitz already had 1,100 inhabitants, not counting the indigenous population. Although situated in harsh environment between desert and Ocean, trade in the harbour town surged, and the adjacent diamond mining settlement of Kolmanskop was built.

After the German World War I capitulation South Africa took over the administration of German South West Africa in 1915. Many Germans were deported from Lüderitz, contributing to its shrinking in population numbers. From 1920 onwards, diamond mining was only conducted further south of town in places like Pomona and Elizabeth Bay. This development consequently led to the loss of Lüderitz' importance as a trading place. Only small fishing enterprises, minimal dock activity and a few carpet weavers remained.

In an effort to remove colonial names from the maps of Namibia, on 8 August 2013 the Namibian government renamed the constituency ǃNamiǂNûs, its name prior to 1884.

Geography 

Just outside Lüderitz lies the ghost town of Kolmanskop, a prominent tourist destination. This previously bustling diamond town is now abandoned, and fights a constant struggle against being buried under the shifting sand dunes of the Namib desert.

Conservation

The coastline in the area is recognised by Bird Life and other global conservation groups as one of the Important Bird Areas (IBAs) for important coastal seabird breeding.

In April 2009, an oil spill from an oil tanker risked hundreds of African penguins and other flora and fauna.

Several species of cetaceans, most notably Haviside's dolphins, can be seen close to the shore while larger whales such as southern right, humpback, minke, fin, pygmy right, are less common but gradually increasing in numbers.

Climate
Lüderitz has a desert climate (BWk, according to the Köppen climate classification), with moderate temperatures throughout the year. Windy and cold conditions can occur due to the cold South Atlantic current on the coast.

Politics
Lüderitz is twinned with  Lüderitz in Germany, part of the town of Tangerhütte since 2010.

Lüderitz is governed by a town council that has seven seats.

The 2015 local authority election was won by SWAPO which gained six seats (2,679 votes). The remaining seat went to the Democratic Turnhalle Alliance (DTA) with 265 votes. SWAPO also won the 2020 local authority election but lost majority control over the town council. SWAPO obtained 1,244 votes and gained three seats. Independent Patriots for Change (IPC), an opposition party formed in August 2020, gained 990 votes and two seats. One seat each went to the Landless People's Movement (LPM, a new party registered in 2018) with 515 votes and the Popular Democratic Movement (PDM, the new name of the DTA since 2017) with 343 votes.

Culture

Media 
Lüderitz has a local monthly newspaper, Buchter News. The paper, which was started as a source of free English-language reading material, is run by volunteers from the British gap year charity Project Trust.

Sport
Lüderitz is home to the Lüderitz Speed Challenge, the only international sporting event held in the town. This is an annual 6 week long speed sailing event held in October and November each year under the auspices of the International Sailing Federation (ISAF) World Sailing Speed Record Council (WSSRC). The Event is the brainchild of French kitesurfer Sebastian Cattalan, who became the first sailor in history to break the 50 Knot barrier in the purpose built canal with a speed of 50.26 Knots in 2008.

In October 2011, Turkish-born American adventurer Erden Eruç departed from Lüderitz Bay for the final ocean crossing of his Guinness world record-setting solo human-powered circumnavigation of the Earth. Eruç rowed to South America in an oceangoing rowboat, taking five months for the crossing to the town of Güiria, Venezuela.

Education

Previously, the German school Deutsche Schule Lüderitzbucht was located in the city. In 1965 it had 13 teachers and 140 learners, and was supported by the German government. The town currently has 3 primary and 2 secondary schools: Diaz, Nautilus, and Helene van Rhijn Primary, and Lüderitz Junior Secondary and Angra Pequena Senior Secondary schools.

Landmarks

 Deutsche Afrika Bank building, erected 1907, national monument
 Felsenkirche on Diamond Hill, a church in vertical gothic style consecrated in 1912. After the diamond rush of 1908 and the completion of the railway line to Keetmanshoop Lüderitz became permanently home to a significant white population. As a result, a number of churches were built. Felsenkirche, one of the oldest Lutheran churches in Namibia, has been a national monument since 1978.
 Glück Auf building, built 1907/08 for a lawyer of the diamond companies, declared a national monument in 2014
 Goerkehaus, the residence of Hans Goerke, manager and co-owner of the early diamond umbrella company, erected 1909–1911, national monument
 Kreplinhaus, the residence of the first mayor, Emil Kreplin, built in 1909, national monument
 Krabbenhöft & Lampe building, after co-owners Friedrich Wilhelm Krabbenhöft and Oscar Lampe. The predecessor of this business, the Handelsstation F.W. Krabbenhöft in Keetmanshoop, existed since 1880 and was one of the first formally registered businesses in South West Africa. Erection of the building started in late 1909, and has been a national monument since 1979.
Lüderitz Railway Station, erected in 1904, is also a national monument.

See also
 Lüderitz Reformed Church

External links

References

Notes

Literature
 
 

 
Populated coastal places in Namibia
Towns in Namibia
Populated places in the ǁKaras Region
Port cities and towns in Namibia
1883 establishments in South West Africa
Populated places established in 1883